Carlos Alberto Ramírez Castillo (born November 6, 1976, in Mexico City) is a retired Mexican professional footballer. He lasted played for Deportivo Irapuato, wearing #13. He is nicknamed "Tin-Tan" because of an apparent physical likeness to the Mexican actor.

Carlos Participated in the 2012 FIFA Futsal World Cup with the Mexico national futsal team wearing # 9.

Career
He debuted with Atlante F.C. in 2003 and played for that team until 2005, scoring 15 goals in 4 seasons. He then came to Tigres in 2006 as part of an agreement that the team made to sign Sebastián González.

In Tigres, Carlos Ramírez became the amulet of victory, for even though he has only scored two goals in one season, those have been of incredible importance for the team. On March 12, 2006, he scored the winning goal at the last minute of the 81st Clásico Regiomontano, and on April 19 he also scored the winning goal, again at the last minute, of the Tigres v. Universidad Católica match of the Copa Libertadores de América group stage that eliminated the Chilean team and had Tigres qualify for round of 16.

Honours

Club
Irapuato
Primera División A:
Runner Up (1) : Apertura 2008

References

External links
 

1976 births
Living people
Liga MX players
Irapuato F.C. footballers
Atlante F.C. footballers
Tigres UANL footballers
Footballers from Mexico City
Association football forwards
Mexican footballers